Ibrahim Farag Abdelhakim Mohamed (born 5 February 1990 in Suez) is an Egyptian freestyle wrestler. He competed in the freestyle 55 kg event at the 2012 Summer Olympics; he was defeated by Vladimer Khinchegashvili in the qualification and eliminated by Radoslav Velikov in the first repechage round.

References

External links
 

1990 births
Living people
Egyptian male sport wrestlers
Olympic wrestlers of Egypt
Wrestlers at the 2012 Summer Olympics
People from Suez